Linda Dill Finn (born August 13, 1959) is an American politician and a Democratic member of the Rhode Island House of Representatives representing District 72 from January 1, 2013 until January 1, 2015.

Education
Finn earned her BS in marketing from Boston College.

Elections
2012 To challenge District 72 incumbent Republican Representative Daniel Reilly, Finn was unopposed for the September 11, 2012 Democratic Primary, winning with 599 votes and won the November 6, 2012 General election by 100 votes with 3,597 votes (50.6%) against Representative Reilly.

References

External links
Official page at the Rhode Island General Assembly
Campaign site

Linda Dill Finn at Ballotpedia
Linda Dill Finn at the National Institute on Money in State Politics

Place of birth missing (living people)
1959 births
Living people
Carroll School of Management alumni
Democratic Party members of the Rhode Island House of Representatives
People from East Providence, Rhode Island
Women state legislators in Rhode Island
21st-century American women